Madira  is a Syrian village located in Douma District, Rif Dimashq. According to the Syria Central Bureau of Statistics (CBS), Madira had a population of 4,308 in the 2004 census.

References 

Populated places in Douma District